Chris Demaria (born September 28, 1980) is an American baseball player who briefly played in the major leagues on two occasions: for the Kansas City Royals in , and for the Milwaukee Brewers in .

Chris attended North High School (Torrance), and graduated in 1998, where he starred in baseball. He played college baseball at Long Beach State University in 2001 and 2002, and in 2002 was drafted in the 17th round by the Pittsburgh Pirates. He played in the Pirates minor league system from 2002 to 2004. After the 2004 season, Demaria was the 1st pick in the Triple-A phase of the Rule 5 draft by the Kansas City Royals. In 2005, Demaria started the season in the Class A California League, but reached the Major Leagues with the Royals by the end of the year.  After the 2005 season, Demaria was traded from the Royals to the Milwaukee Brewers for Justin Barnes. Demaria started the 2006 season at the Brewers' Triple-A affiliate, the Nashville Sounds, and was called up to Milwaukee in mid April. He was sent back to Nashville in May, where he remained for the rest of the season. During spring training in 2007, Demaria was released by the Brewers.

External links

Kansas City Royals players
Milwaukee Brewers players
Baseball players from Torrance, California
1980 births
Living people
Nashville Sounds players
Long Beach State Dirtbags baseball players
St. Cloud River Bats players
Hickory Crawdads players
High Desert Mavericks players
Surprise Scorpions players
Wichita Wranglers players
Williamsport Crosscutters players
El Camino Warriors baseball players